The Nysted reagent is a reagent used in organic synthesis for the methylenation of a carbonyl group.  It was discovered in 1975 by Leonard N. Nysted in Chicago, Illinois. It was originally prepared by reacting dibromomethane and activated zinc in THF.  A proposed mechanism for the methenylation reaction runs as follows:

A similar reagent is Tebbe's reagent.  In the Nysted olefination, the Nysted reagent reacts with TiCl4 to methylenate a carbonyl group.  The biggest problem with these reagents are that the reactivity has not been well documented.  It is believed that the TiCl4 acts as a mediator in the reaction.  Nysted reagent can methylenate different carbonyl groups in the presence of different mediators.  For example, in the presence of BF3•OEt2, the reagent will methylenate aldehydes.  On the other hand, in the presence of TiCl4, TiCl3 or TiCl2 and BF3•OEt2, the reagent can methylenate ketones.  Most commonly, it is used to methylenate ketones because of their general difficulty to methylenate due to crowding around the carbonyl group. The Nysted reagent is able to overcome the additional steric hindrance found in ketones, and more easily methylenate the carbonyl group. In contrast to the Wittig reaction the neutral reaction conditions of the Nysted reagent make it a useful alternative for the methylenation of easily enolizable ketones.

There is little research on Nysted reagent because of the hazards and high reactivity and the difficulty of keeping the reagent stable while it is in use.  More specifically, it can form explosive peroxides when exposed to air and is extremely flammable.  Also, it reacts violently with water.  These make this reagent very dangerous to work with.

See also  
Petasis reagent
Titanium–zinc methylenation
Wittig reaction

References 

Organozinc compounds
Reagents for organic chemistry
Zinc complexes